In computer programming, pidgin code is a mixture of several programming languages in the same program, or pseudocode that is a mixture of a programming language with natural language descriptions. Hence the name: the mixture is a programming language analogous to a pidgin in natural languages.

In numerical computation, mathematical style pseudocode is sometimes called pidgin code, for example pidgin ALGOL (the origin of the concept), pidgin Fortran, pidgin BASIC, pidgin  Pascal, and pidgin  C. It is a compact and often informal notation that blends syntax taken from a conventional programming language with mathematical notation, typically using set theory and matrix operations, and perhaps also natural language descriptions. 

It can be understood by a wide range of mathematically trained people, and is used as a way to describe algorithms where the control structure is made explicit at a rather high level of detail, while some data structures are still left at an abstract level, independent of any specific programming language. 

Normally non-ASCII typesetting is used for the mathematical equations, for example by means of TeX or MathML markup, or proprietary Formula editor formats. 

These are examples of articles that contain mathematical style pseudo code:

Algorithm
Conjugate gradient method
Ford-Fulkerson algorithm
Gauss–Seidel method
Generalized minimal residual method
Jacobi eigenvalue algorithm
Jacobi method
Karmarkar's algorithm
Particle swarm optimization
Stone method
Successive over-relaxation
Symbolic Cholesky decomposition
Tridiagonal matrix algorithm

See also
 Pseudocode

Algorithm description languages